Chadds Ford Township is an affluent township in Delaware County, Pennsylvania, United States.

Prior to 1996, Chadds Ford Township was known as Birmingham Township; the name was changed to allow the township to correspond to both its census-designated place and to distinguish itself from the adjacent Birmingham Township in Chester County. As of the 2010 census, Chadds Ford Township had a population of 3,640, up from 3,170 at the 2000 census.

Chadds Ford was home to N. C. Wyeth, his son Andrew Wyeth, his daughter Ann Wyeth McCoy, and his grandson Jamie Wyeth. Brandywine Battlefield, the site of the Battle of Brandywine during the American Revolutionary War, is located in the township, along with Brandywine River Museum, which houses much of the Wyeth collection.

History

The township's original name was Birmingham, which was given to it by William Brinton in remembrance of the town of the same name in England.

Frances Chadsey, or Chads, improperly spelled Chadd, emigrated from Wiltshire, England in 1689 and lived in Chichester Township until 1696 when his name first appeared in the Birmingham Township tax records.

On September 11, 1777, the house owned by George Gilpin was occupied by General Howe of the British Army during the Battle of Brandywine. The local significance of the battle is such that a 1940 guidebook noted that "a local barber displays a large sign: 'This is where Washington and Lafayette had a close shave.'"

The Chad House, Chadds Ford Historic District, Gilpin Homestead, and William Painter Farm are all listed on the National Register of Historic Places.

Geography
The township is the westernmost in Delaware County and is bordered to the west by Chester County, to the south by the state of Delaware, and to the east by Concord Township. The southern border is part of the Twelve-Mile Circle border between Delaware and Pennsylvania. Brandywine Creek forms the western boundary of both the township and of Delaware County.

The village of Chadds Ford is in the northwest part of the township, and a small piece of Dilworthtown is in the northern corner of the township.

Climate
The climate in this area is characterized by hot, humid summers and generally cool to cold winters. According to the Köppen Climate Classification system, Chadds Ford Township is on the border of the humid subtropical climate and humid continental climate.  Of these two climate zones, Chadds Ford has much more in common with the humid continental climate. The hardiness zone is 7a.  Average monthly temperatures in the village center of Chadds Ford range from 31.5 °F in January to 75.9 °F in July.

Demographics

As of 2010 census, the racial makeup of the township was 89.4% White, 1.4% African American, 0.0% Native American, 7.6% Asian, 0.5% from other races, and 1.1% from two or more races. Hispanic or Latino of any race were 2.9% of the population .

Education
Chadds Ford Township is located in the Unionville-Chadds Ford School District and public school students attend the district's schools. High school students at Unionville High School in Kennett Square.

Rachel Kohl Library serves Chadds Ford Township.

Points of interest 
 Brandywine Battlefield Park
 Brandywine River Museum
N. C. Wyeth House and Studio
"The Mills", Andrew Wyeth home and studio
Kuerner Farm
 Brandywine Wildflower and Native Plant Gardens
 Chad House
 Chadds Ford Historic District
 Christian C. Sanderson Museum
 Gilpin Homestead
 William Painter Farm
 Twaddell's Mill and House

Transportation

U.S. Route 1 (Baltimore Pike) runs through the northern part of the township and intersects U.S. Routes 202 and 322 at Painters Crossroads on the township's eastern border. US 1 leads southwest toward Maryland, while US 202 leads south to Wilmington, Delaware, and US 322 leads east to Chester. US 202 and 322 together lead north to West Chester.

Notable people
Bill Bergey 
Weldon Brinton Heyburn, former U.S. Senator
Erin Matson (field hockey)
Ann Wyeth McCoy
Pat Meehan
Robin Toner, journalist
Andrew Wyeth
Jamie Wyeth
N.C. Wyeth

References

External links

Chadds Ford Township official website
Chadds Ford at DelawareCountyPA.com
Chadds Ford History

 
Townships in Delaware County, Pennsylvania
Townships in Pennsylvania